No Place is a village in England.

No Place may also refer to:

No Place (A Lot Like Birds album)
No Place (film), a 2005 film
"No Place" (song), a 2018 song by Rüfüs Du Sol
No Place (Backstreet Boys song)